Alman is a village in the  Marjeyoun District in South Lebanon.

Name
According to E. H. Palmer, the name Alman is perhaps from the Arabic form of “a sign-post” or “a mountain”.

History
In 1875 Victor Guérin visited, and noted that some houses were built with large stones which appeared ancient.

In 1881, the PEF's Survey of Western Palestine  (SWP) described it: "A few houses built of stone on the ruins of a village; they contain about forty Metawileh. The place is situated on the edge of the cliffs above the Litany River, and is surrounded by a few gardens with figs and olives; there are five rock-cut cisterns and a birket." They further noted: "The  present village is built on the ruins of a former town, of which the foundations can be seen. The houses are built with great blocks of ancient appearance. On the north side there is a rock-cut tomb, with roughly-sculptured figures over the entrance: this is called Mugharet ish Shahl."

References

Bibliography

External links 
Survey of Western Palestine, Map 2:   IAA, Wikimedia commons

Populated places in Marjeyoun District
Shia Muslim communities in Lebanon